Nicholas John Charles Gandon (born 7 July 1956) is a former English cricketer. Gandon is a right-handed batsman who bowled right-arm off break. He was born in Leicester, Leicestershire.

Gandon made his debut in county cricket for Hertfordshire in the 1975 Minor Counties Championship. He studied at Durham University, where he completed a General Studies degree in 1978 and earned a Palatinate for his cricketing activities. Following his time at Durham, he made his first-class debut for Oxford University against Hampshire in 1979. He made 7 further first-class appearances for the University, all coming in 1979, with the last coming against the touring Sri Lankans. In his 8 first-class matches, he scored 170 runs at an average of 14.16, with a high score of 38. 1979 also saw him make his List A debut for Combined Universities against Essex in the Benson & Hedges Cup.

After leaving Oxford University, Gandon proceeded to play Minor counties cricket for Hertfordshire until 1988. He joined Lincolnshire for the 1989 season, making his debut for the county against Hertfordshire in the 1989 Minor Counties Championship. He played Minor counties cricket for Lincolnshire from 1989 to 1993, making 35 Minor Counties Championship appearances and 9 MCCA Knockout Trophy matches. He played his first List A appearances for Lincolnshire against Gloucestershire in the 1990 NatWest Trophy, a match in which he scored 31 runs before being dismissed by Mark Alleyne. He made his second and final List A appearance for Lincolnshire in the 1991 NatWest Trophy against Nottinghamshire, with Gandon being dismissed by Mark Crawley. Leaving Lincolnshire at the end of the 1993 season, Gandon returned to Hertfordshire, where he played Minor counties cricket from 1994 to 1996.

Professionally, Gandon worked in a number of independent schools, where he held a range of senior management positions. In 2003 he was appointed Director of the Cricket Foundation, where he devised and implemented the Chance to Shine campaign.

In May 2009, Nick Gandon launched third-sector fundraising company Cause4 with Michelle Wright and Charles Pike.  In 2013 he founded Aureus Social Ventures which offers consultancy services to charities, social enterprises and socially-driven businesses.  Outside of his professional life Gandon is Chairman of Hoddesdon Cricket Club, Chairman of a homelessness charity and a trustee of a prison mentoring charity.

References

External links
Nick Gandon at ESPNcricinfo
Nick Gandon at CricketArchive

1956 births
Living people
Cricketers from Leicester
English cricketers
Hertfordshire cricketers
Oxford University cricketers
Lincolnshire cricketers
Schoolteachers from Leicestershire
English philanthropists
Alumni of St Edmund Hall, Oxford
British Universities cricketers
Alumni of St John's College, Durham